The Clare island Survey was a multidisciplinary (zoological, botanical, archaeological, and geological) survey of Clare Island an island off the West coast of Ireland.

The survey which followed a similar survey of Lambay Island in 1905 and 1906 was proposed by Robert Lloyd Praeger and in April 1908 a committee was formed to recruit and organise the work of over one hundred scientists from Ireland, England Denmark, Germany and Switzerland and the data collected during three years of field work on the island (1909-1911).
The committee members were Robert Lloyd Praeger, Robert Francis Scharff, Richard Manliffe Barrington, Grenville Cole, Nathaniel Colgan and Henry William Lett.

The bulk of the work is concerned with systematic zoology and botany but paid special attention to questions of geographical distribution, dispersal, and ecology and covered antiquities, place-names, family names, geology, climatology, agriculture and  meteorology.

The results were published both  as A Biological Survey of Clare Island in the County of Mayo, Ireland and of the Adjoining District. Parts 1-68 (part 8 was never published) Dublin Hodges, Figgis, & Co., Ltd., for the Royal Irish Academy, 1911-1915.:The sections are Introduction, Archaeology, Irish Names, Agriculture, Climatology, Geology, Botany, Zoology and as separateparts in the Proceedings of the Royal Irish Academy.

The parts are:

Part 1 Introduction and General Narrative   Robert John Welch, Robert Lloyd Praeger
Part 2. History and Archaeology  T. J. Westropp
Part 3. Place-Names and Family Names   John Macneill
 Part 4. Gaelic Plant and Animal Names and Associated Folk-Lore Nathaniel Colgan (also worked on marine mollusca and algae)
 Part 5. Agriculture and its History  James Wilson (Irish naturalist)
Part 6 Climatology  W. J. Lyons
Part 7 Geology   Edward Alexander Newell Arber and Timothy Hallissy
Part 8 not published
Part 9 Tree growth   Arthur C. Forbes
Part 10: Phanerogamia and Pteridophyta  Robert Lloyd Praeger (also vegetation map, marine dredging, marine algae, fungi, sponges and mollusca with Hedwig Praeger)
Parts 11–12: Musci and Hepaticae   Henry William Lett
Part 13 Fungi   Henry Hawley (naturalist)
Part 14 Lichens   Annie Lorrain Smith
Part 15 Marine Algae   Arthur Disbrowe Cotton
Part 16 Fresh-water algae, with a supplement of marine diatoms   William West
Part 17 Mammalia   Gerald Edwin Hamilton Barrett-Hamilton
Part 18 Reptilia and Amphibia   Robert Francis Scharff (also worked on Molluscs & woodlice)
Part 19 Fish   George Philip Farran (also worked on marine dredging)
Part 20 Aves   Richard John Ussher
Part 21 Tunicata and Hemichorda   George Philip Farran
Part 22 Marine Mollusca   Nathaniel Colgan.
Part 23 Land and Fresh-water Mollusca    Arthur Wilson Stelfox
Part 24 Hymenoptera   Claude Morley
Part 25 Diptera   Percy Hall Grimshaw online here
Part 26 Lepidoptera   William Francis de Vismes Kane
Part 27 Neuroptera   James Nathaniel Halbert (also worked on other insects (all orders))
Part 28 Terrestrial Coleoptera James Nathaniel Halbert
Part 29 Aquatic Coleoptyera   William Alexander Francis Balfour Browne (also worked on land beetles and other insects (all orders))
Part 30 Hemiptera   James Nathaniel Halbert
Part 31 Orthoptera   George Carpenter (also worked on other insects (all orders))
Part 32 Apterygota   George Carpenter
Part 33 Chilopoda and Diplopoda   William Frederick Johnson (also worked on other insects (all orders))
Part 34 Pycnogonida   George Carpenter
Part 35 Araneae   Denis Robert Pack-Beresford
Part 36 Phalangida   Denis Robert Pack-Beresford
Part 37 Arctiscoida   James Murray
Part 38 Pseudoscorpiones   Harry Wallis Kew
Part 39 Acarinida: Section I: Hydracarina
Part 39b Acarinida: Section II Terrestrial and Marine Acarina  James Nathaniel Halbert
Part 40 Decapoda   George Philip Farran
Part 41 Nebaliacea   Walter Medley Tattersall (also marine dredging)
Part 42 Amphipoda   Walter Medley Tattersall
Part 43 Marine lsopoda and Tanaidacea   Walter Medley Tattersall
Part 44 Land and Fresh-Water Isopoda   Nevin Harkness Foster (also worked on birds)
Part 45 Marine Entomostraca   George Philip Farran
Part 46 Fresh-water Entomostraca   David Joseph Scourfield
Part 47 Archiannelida and Polychaeta   Rowland Southern (also marine dredging)
Part 48 Gephyrea   Rowland Southern
Part 49 Oligochaeta   Rowland Southern
Part 50 Hirudinea   Rowland Southern
Part 51 Rotifera   Charles F. Rousselet
Part 52 Rotifera Bdelloida   James Murray
Part 53 Polyzoa   Albert Russell Nichols
Part 54 Nemathelmia, Kinorhyncha, and Chaetognatha   Rowland Southern
Part 55: Nemertinea   Rowland Southern
Part 56 Platyhelmia   Rowland Southern
Part 57 Echinodermata   Albert Russell Nichols
Part 58 Coelenterata   Jane Stephens
Part 59 Marine Porifera   Jane Stephens
Part 60 Fresh-water Porifera   Jane Stephens
Part 61 and 62 Flagellata and Ciliata   John Samuel Dunkerly (also other Infusoria)
Part 63 Mycetozoa   Gulielma Lister
Part 64 Foraminifera    Arthur Earland and Edward Heron-Allen
Part 65 Foraminifera   G.H. Wailes
Part 66. Notes on marine plankton   George Philip Farran
Part 67 Marine Ecology  Roland Southern
Part 68 General Summary   Robert Lloyd Praeger

Nonpublishing participants John Adams (naturalist) (Marine algae); Edward Alexander Newell Arber (Geology); James Bayley Butler (Protozoa); Frederik Børgesen (Marine algae); George W. Chaster (Mollusca); Grenville Cole (Geology), George Fogerty (Archaeology); Thomas Greer (Lepidoptera); David Thomas Gwynne-Vaughan (botany); Arthur William Hill (Botany); John De Witt Hinch (Glacial geology); Stanley Wells Kemp (marine dredging); Matilda Cullen Knowles (lichens, flowering plants, peat deposits); David McArdle (Mosses and hepatics); James Napier Milne (insects); Charles Joseph Patten (birds); Eugène Penard (rhizopods); Walter Mead Rankin (Crustacea and Decapoda); Colin M. Selbie (marine dredging and Crustacea); Otto Stapf (botany); Isaac Swain (geology)

References

Islands of County Mayo
History of County Mayo
Natural history of Ireland